Pioneers F.C. may refer to:

 Pioneers F.C., a Saint Lucia Gold Division team
 Pioneers F.C. (Dublin), a former League of Ireland team 
 Pioneers FC (Nevis), a N1 League team